San Francisco Bay Diablos were an American soccer team that played in San Francisco, California as a member of the USISL from 1993 to 1995.

History
Owner Mario Chavez coached the team during its inaugural season in 1993.  In 1994, he brought in former Nigerian international Tony Igwe to coach.  Igwe lasted only four games with the team losing all four games.  Chavez, then struck a deal with Salvador Lopez to bring in the 1993 Lamar Hunt US Open Cup Champions C.D. Mexico (aka, El Farolito Soccer Club) to take over the club and run the team.  The team enjoyed immediate success and if not for an 18-point deduction in points for a rules violation, the club would have made their first and only playoff appearance.  In 1995, Lopez withdrew his support and the cooperation between the two clubs ceased. The Diablos struggled their way to the end of the season and folded at that time after three seasons in the league.

Year-by-year

External links
 The Year in American Soccer - 1993
 The Year in American Soccer - 1994
 The Year in American Soccer - 1995

Defunct soccer clubs in California
D
USISL teams
1993 establishments in California
1995 disestablishments in California
Soccer clubs in California
Association football clubs established in 1993
Association football clubs disestablished in 1995